Eduard Zahariev (1 July 1938 – 26 June 1996) was a Bulgarian film director and screenwriter.

Being among the prominent Bulgarian film directors from the last decades of the 20th century, Zahariev directed 15 films between 1962 and 1996, most notably The Hare Census (1973), Villa Zone (1975), Manly Times (1977), Almost a Love Story (1980), Elegy (1982) and My Darling, My Darling (1986) which was entered into the 36th Berlin International Film Festival.

His movie Villa Zone (1975) won a Special Prize of the Jury at the Karlovy Vary International Film Festival and the film Belated Full Moon (1996) was nominated for Crystal Globe award at the same festival.

Filmography

Director

References

Sources

External links

1938 births
1996 deaths
Bulgarian film directors
Bulgarian satirists
Bulgarian screenwriters
Male screenwriters
People from Sofia
20th-century screenwriters